Lobularia is a genus of five species of flowering plants in the family Brassicaceae, closely related to (and formerly often included in) the genus Alyssum.

The name Lobularia derives from the Greek for a small pod, referring to the fruits.

Selected species
Lobularia canariensis
Lobularia libyca
Lobularia intermedia (syn. L. canariensis subsp. intermedia)
Lobularia marginata (syn. L. canariensis subsp. marginata)
Lobularia maritima

Cultivation and uses

Lobularia maritima (sweet alyssum; syn. Alyssum maritimum) is a very popular garden plant; it has become widely naturalised throughout the temperate world.

References

External links
Lobularia canariensis (in Spanish; photo)
Lobularia lybica (in Spanish; photo)

Brassicaceae
Brassicaceae genera